Thomas Jervis (1770–1838) was an English judge, the last Puisne Justice of Chester until the abolition of the office in 1830. He was also Member of Parliament for Great Yarmouth. With Mary Ann née Dixon Old Swinford, Worcestershire, he had three sons and a daughter. The family name was from a noble ancestor Gervasius de Stanton. His youngest son was Attorney General of England and Wales, Sir John Jervis.

He appeared for the prosecution in the 1812 trial of William Booth for forgery. Booth was sentenced to hang.

References

Bibliography
Getzler, J. S. (2004) "Jervis, Sir John (1802–1856)", Oxford Dictionary of National Biography, Oxford University Press, accessed 4 July 2007
 

19th-century English judges
1770 births
1838 deaths
Members of the Parliament of the United Kingdom for English constituencies
UK MPs 1802–1806
Politics of the Borough of Great Yarmouth